Ota City General Gymnasium is an arena in Ōta, Tokyo, Japan. It is the home arena of the Earth Friends Tokyo Z of the B.League, Japan's professional basketball league.

Gallery

References

Basketball venues in Japan
Earth Friends Tokyo Z
Indoor arenas in Japan
Sports venues in Tokyo
Tokyo Cinq Rêves
Ōta, Tokyo
Sports venues completed in 2012
2012 establishments in Japan